São Bernardino is a municipality in the state of Santa Catarina in the South region of Brazil. It was created in 1995 out of the municipality of Campo Erê.

See also
List of municipalities in Santa Catarina

References

Municipalities in Santa Catarina (state)